James Braid (6 February 1870 – 27 November 1950) was a Scottish professional golfer and a member of the Great Triumvirate of the sport alongside Harry Vardon and John Henry Taylor. He won The Open Championship five times. He also was a renowned golf course architect. Braid is a member of the World Golf Hall of Fame.

Braid was born in Earlsferry, Fife, Scotland, the son of James and Mary (née Harris). He played golf from an early age, working as a clubmaker before turning professional in 1896. Initially his game was hindered by problems with his putting, but he overcame this after switching to an aluminium putter in 1900. He won The Open Championship in 1901, 1905, 1906, 1908 and 1910. In addition, Braid won four British PGA Matchplay Championships (1903, 1905, 1907 and 1911), as well as the 1910 French Open title. He was also runner-up in The Open Championship in 1897, 1902, 1904, and 1909. His 1906 victory in The Open Championship was the last successful defence of the title by a European until Pádraig Harrington replicated the feat in 2008.

In 1912, Braid scaled back his tournament golf, and became a full-time club professional at Walton Heath; he had begun a relationship with that London-area club more than a decade before. He developed a very successful career in golf course design, and is sometimes regarded as the "inventor" of the dogleg, although holes of similar design had been known for centuries (for example, the Road Hole at the Old Course at St Andrews). Among his designs are the "King's Course" and the "Queen's Course" at Gleneagles, and the 1926 remodelling of The Open Championship venue Carnoustie Golf Links.

Stranraer Golf Club's course was the final one that was designed by Braid in the year that he died, 1950. He was called out of retirement to plan Creachmore, which was to be his last commission. Braid never lived to see the course completed. He died in London on 27 November 1950.

Harry Vardon and Braid collaborated on several editions of Spalding Athletic Library "How to Play Golf". Braid also wrote "Advanced Golf, or, Hints and Instruction for Progressive Players" in 1911. There is also a book about all the courses Braid designed as an architect titled "James Braid and his 400 courses."

Tournament wins (19)
Note: This list may be incomplete.
1901 The Open Championship, Lytham and St Anne's Professional Tournament
1902 Tooting Bec Cup, Greenore Professional Tournament
1903 News of the World Match Play, Tooting Bec Cup
1904 Tooting Bec Cup
1905 The Open Championship, News of the World Match Play
1906 The Open Championship
1907 News of the World Match Play, Tooting Bec Cup
1908 The Open Championship
1910 The Open Championship, French Open
1911 News of the World Match Play
1920 Galashiels Tournament, McVitie & Price Tournament (joint winner with Abe Mitchell), Amateurs and Professionals Foursomes Tournament (with J. H. Taylor)

Major championships are shown in bold.

Major championships

Wins (5)

Results timeline

Note: Braid only played in The Open Championship

NT = No tournament
CUT = missed the half-way cut
"T" indicates a tie for a place

Team appearances
England–Scotland Professional Match (representing Scotland): 1903 (winners), 1904 (tie), 1905 (tie), 1906, 1907, 1909, 1910, 1912 (tie)
France vs Great Britain (representing Great Britain): 1908 (winners)
Coronation Match (representing the Professionals): 1911 (winners)
Great Britain vs USA (representing Great Britain): 1921 (winners)
Seniors vs Juniors (representing the Seniors): 1928 (winners)

Golf courses designed by Braid
Braid designed over 200 courses including the following:

 Dalmahoy (East and West), Kirknewton, West Lothian, Scotland
 Erskine Golf Club, Erskine, Renfrewshire, Scotland
 Gleneagles Hotel (King's and Queen's), Auchterarder, Perth and Kinross, Scotland
 Kirkhill Golf Club, South Lanarkshire
 La Moye Golf Club, Jersey
 Lancaster Golf Club, Lancashire 
 Renfrew Golf Club, Renfrew, Renfrewshire, Scotland
 Southport and Ainsdale Golf Club, Merseyside, England

Singapore designs
Braid disliked travel overseas, very rarely left the British Isles, and never traveled outside Europe. But he did design two 18-hole golf courses for the Singapore Island Country Club in Asia, using topographic maps to plan his layouts there, which were then constructed to his orders.

See also
List of men's major championships winning golfers
List of golfers with most wins in one PGA Tour event

References

Further reading

External links 

James Braid profile at Golf Legends

James Braid Golf Trail
Golf House Club Elie
SoHG Archives
James Braid: A Man of Character, article by Bernard Darwin
James Braid on Golf Course Architecture

Scottish male golfers
Golf course architects
Winners of men's major golf championships
World Golf Hall of Fame inductees
Sportspeople from Fife
People from Elie and Earlsferry
1870 births
1950 deaths